Sissel Kyrkjebø, known as Sissel, is a Norwegian soprano. A child star since the age of 11, she is now a national figure in Norway and has performed all across the globe, selling 10 million solo albums since her recording debut at the age of only 16; she was a featured vocalist on the biggest selling soundtrack recording in history, the 1997 release Titanic: Music from the Motion Picture (30 million sold), performing wordless vocals on the soundtrack.

Discography

Studio albums

Christmas albums

Collaborations

Soundtracks

Singles and promotional single releases

Other albums

DVDs

Music videos 

Har en dröm (1987)
Folket som danser (1987)
Se over fjellet (1989)
Seterjentens søndag (1989)
Soria Moria (1989)
Mellom himmel og jord (1990)
The Gift Of Love (1992)
Se ilden lyse (1994)
Fire In Your Heart (1994)
Prince Igor (1997)
Where The Lost Ones Go (2001)
Can't Go Back (2002)
Carrier of a Secret (2002)
Gå inte förbi (2003)
Venn (2005)
Frostroses (2007)

References 

Discography
Discographies of Norwegian artists